Mike Hominuck (born May 4, 1981 in Welland, Ontario) is a former lacrosse player for the National Lacrosse League. On September 7, 2011, Hominuck signed with the Philadelphia Wings. He played for the Welland Cougars Jr. B hockey club. He is currently a Teacher at Notre Dame College School in Welland, Ontario, Canada.  In 2013, he announced his retirement.

Statistics

NLL
Reference:

References

1981 births
Buffalo Bandits players
Canadian lacrosse players
Edmonton Rush players
Living people
Minnesota Swarm players
Portland LumberJax players
Sportspeople from Welland
Lacrosse forwards
Lacrosse people from Ontario
Ice hockey people from Ontario
Toronto Rock players
Philadelphia Wings players